CJK Unified Ideographs Extension E is a Unicode block containing rare and historic CJK ideographs for Chinese, Japanese, Korean, and Vietnamese.

The block has dozens of ideographic variation sequences registered in the Unicode Ideographic Variation Database (IVD).
These sequences specify the desired glyph variant for a given Unicode character.

Block

History
The following Unicode-related documents record the purpose and process of defining specific characters in the CJK Unified Ideographs Extension E block:

References 

Unicode blocks